The Parliament Museum is a museum in the Parliament of India Library Building in New Delhi, close to the Sansad Bhavan. It was inaugurated by then Speaker of Lok Sabha on 29 December 1989, in Parliament House Annexe, subsequently it shifted to its present in a Special Hall of the Sansadiya Gyanpeeth, Parliament Library Building, where it was inaugurated on 7 May 2002 by President of India, K. R. Narayanan. The interactive museum was inaugurated by President A.P.J. Abdul Kalam on 15 August 2006.

It is an interactive museum  which  tells  us the story of freedom struggle of India. It also  has rare collection of gifts from foreign delegates to the Speaker of Lok Sabha.

Timings
Museum is open from 11.00 AM to 5 PM from Tuesdays to Saturdays. The Museum remains closed on every Sunday and Monday, during the inter-Session period; it is open on Mondays when the Parliament is in session.

History
In 2004, after assuming the Office of Speaker, Lok Sabha, Somnath Chatterjee expressed keen personal interest in setting up a Museum on democratic heritage in India, a museum that he thought would be modern, high-tech and would conform to international standards. Dr. Saroj Ghose, former President of the International Council of Museums, Paris, and retired Director General of National Council of Science Museums in India was invited to submit an appropriate proposal. After the final proposal was accepted, the construction work started under the guidance of Parliament officials and elected leaders. On 14 August 2006, it was inaugurated by Prof A. P. J. Abdul Kalam, the then President of India, in presence of Bhairon Singh Shekhawat, then vice-president, Dr. Manmohan Singh Prime Minister, Somnath Chatterjee, Speaker of Lok Sabha and many other distinguished guests. On 5 September 2006, the Museum was opened to general public.

References

External links
 Official website

Museums in Delhi
Parliament of India
Museums established in 1989
History museums in India
Histories of legislatures